The 1984 Individual Ice Speedway World Championship was the 19th edition of the World Championship  The Championship was held on 17 and 18 February 1984 at the Lenin Stadium in Moscow in the Soviet Union.

The winner was Erik Stenlund of the Sweden. This was the first time since 1974 when the Championship was won by a rider not representing the Soviet Union.

Anatoly Gladyshev was killed during the 23rd heat of the second day. After colliding with Vitaly Russkikh he fell into the path of Walter Wartbichler who ran over him. He suffered an artery rupture caused by the front tyre of the bike and died later in hospital.

Classification

See also 
 1984 Individual Speedway World Championship in classic speedway
 1984 Team Ice Racing World Championship

References 

Ice speedway competitions
World